C.D. Dinamo Español is a Honduran football club, based in Tegucigalpa, Honduras.

They currently play in Liga Mayor.

Squad

References

Football clubs in Honduras
Football clubs in Tegucigalpa